Hernandia mascarenensis is a species of plant in the Hernandiaceae family. It is found in Mauritius and Réunion.

References

Hernandiaceae
Endangered plants
Flora of Mauritius
Taxonomy articles created by Polbot